Polina Miller may refer to:

Polina Miller (gymnast) (born 1988), Russian artistic gymnast
Polina Miller (sprinter) (born 2000), Russian track sprinter